Pernamitta is a village in Prakasam of Andhra Pradesh.

References 

Villages in Prakasam district